Ammonium bicarbonate is an inorganic compound with formula (NH4)HCO3. The compound has many names, reflecting its long history. Chemically speaking, it is the bicarbonate salt of the ammonium ion. It is a colourless solid that degrades readily to carbon dioxide, water and ammonia.

Production
Ammonium bicarbonate is produced by combining carbon dioxide and ammonia:
CO2 + NH3 + H2O → (NH4)HCO3
Since ammonium bicarbonate is thermally unstable, the reaction solution is kept cold, which allows the precipitation of the product as white solid. About 100,000 tons were produced in this way in 1997.

Ammonia gas passed into a strong aqueous solution of the sesquicarbonate (a 2:1:1 mixture of (NH4)HCO3, (NH4)2CO3, and H2O) converts it into normal ammonium carbonate ((NH4)2CO3), which can be obtained in the crystalline condition from a solution prepared at about 30 °C. This compound on exposure to air gives off ammonia and reverts to ammonium bicarbonate.

Salt of hartshorn
Compositions containing ammonium carbonate have long been known. They were once produced commercially, formerly known as sal volatile or salt of hartshorn. It was obtained by the dry distillation of nitrogenous organic matter such as hair, horn, leather. In addition to ammonium bicarbonate, this material contains ammonium carbamate (NH4CO2NH2), and ammonium carbonate ((NH4)2CO3). It is sometimes called ammonium sesquicarbonate. It possesses a strong ammoniacal smell, and on digestion with alcohol, the carbamate is dissolved leaving a residue of ammonium bicarbonate.

A similar decomposition takes place when the sesquicarbonate is exposed to air.

Uses 
Ammonium bicarbonate is used in the food industry as a leavening agent for flat baked goods, such as cookies and crackers. It was commonly used in the home before modern-day baking powder was made available. Many baking cookbooks, especially from Scandinavian countries, may still refer to it as hartshorn or hornsalt, while it is known as "hirvensarvisuola" in Finnish, "hjortetakksalt" in Norwegian, "hjortetakssalt" in Danish, "hjorthornssalt" in Swedish, and "Hirschhornsalz" in German (lit., "salt of hart's horn"). Although there is a slight smell of ammonia during baking, this quickly dissipates, leaving no taste. It is used in, for example, Swedish "drömmar" biscuits and Danish "brunkager" Christmas biscuits, and German Lebkuchen. In many cases it may be replaced with baking soda or baking powder, or a combination of both, depending on the recipe composition and leavening requirements. Compared to baking soda or potash, hartshorn has the advantage of producing more gas for the same amount of agent, and of not leaving any salty or soapy taste in the finished product, as it completely decomposes into water and gaseous products that evaporate during baking. It cannot be used for moist, bulky baked goods however, such as normal bread or cakes, since some ammonia will be trapped inside and will cause an unpleasant taste. It has been assigned E number E503 for use as a food additive in the European Union.

It is commonly used as an inexpensive nitrogen fertilizer in China, but is now being phased out in favor of urea for quality and stability. This compound is used as a component in the production of fire-extinguishing compounds, pharmaceuticals, dyes, pigments, and it is also a basic fertilizer, being a source of ammonia. Ammonium bicarbonate is still widely used in the plastics and rubber industry, in the manufacture of ceramics, in chrome leather tanning, and for the synthesis of catalysts.

It is also used for buffering solutions to make them slightly alkaline during chemical purification, such as high-performance liquid chromatography. Because it entirely decomposes to volatile compounds, this allows rapid recovery of the compound of interest by freeze-drying.

Ammonium bicarbonate is also a key component of the expectorant cough syrup "Senega and Ammonia".

Reactions
It dissolves in water to give a mildly alkaline solution. It is insoluble in acetone and alcohols. 

Ammonium bicarbonate decomposes above about 36 °C into ammonia, carbon dioxide, and water in an endothermic process and so causes a drop in the temperature of the water:
NH4HCO3 → NH3 + H2O + CO2.

When treated with acids, ammonium salts are also produced:
NH4HCO3 + HCl → NH4Cl + CO2 + H2O.
Reaction with base produces ammonia.

It reacts with sulfates of alkaline-earth metals precipitating their carbonates:
CaSO4 + 2 NH4HCO3 → CaCO3 + (NH4)2SO4 + CO2 + H2O.

It also reacts with alkali metal halides, giving alkali metal bicarbonate and ammonium halide:
NH4HCO3 + NaCl → NH4Cl + NaHCO3;
NH4HCO3 + KI → NH4I + KHCO3;
NH4HCO3 + NaBr → NH4Br + NaHCO3.

Natural occurrence
The compound occurs in nature as an exceedingly rare mineral teschemacherite. It can also be obtained from deer antlers.

Safety
Ammonium bicarbonate is an irritant to the skin, eyes and respiratory system. Short-term health effects may occur immediately or shortly after exposure to ammonium bicarbonate. Breathing ammonium bicarbonate can irritate the nose, throat and lungs causing coughing, wheezing and/or shortness of breath. Repeated exposure may cause bronchitis to develop with cough, and/or shortness of breath. Health effects can occur some time after exposure to ammonium bicarbonate and can last for months or years.

Where possible, operations should be enclosed and the use of local exhaust ventilation at the site of chemical release is recommended. If local exhaust ventilation or enclosure is not used, respirators are necessary. Wear protective work clothing and change clothes and wash thoroughly immediately after exposure to ammonium bicarbonate.

Ammonium bicarbonate from China used to make cookies was found to be contaminated with melamine, and imports were banned in Malaysia following the 2008 Chinese milk scandal.

References

Bicarbonates
Ammonium compounds
Acid salts
Food acidity regulators